Liolaemus antonietae, Antonieta's lizard, is a species of lizard in the family  Liolaemidae. It is native to Chile.

References

antonietae
Reptiles described in 2018
Reptiles of Chile
Endemic fauna of Chile
Taxa named by Jaime Troncoso-Palacios
Taxa named by Damien Esquerré
Taxa named by Hugo A. Díaz
Taxa named by María Soledad Ruiz